Gyula Futó (29 December 1908 – 2 October 1977) was a Hungarian footballer who played for Újpest FC, as well as representing the Hungarian national football team at the 1934 FIFA World Cup. He played 7 games for the Hungarian national team as a defender.

References

1908 births
1977 deaths
1934 FIFA World Cup players
Hungarian footballers
Hungary international footballers
Újpest FC players
Association football defenders